Lahore Electric Supply Company (LESCO) is an electric distribution company that supplies electricity to the districts of Lahore, Okara, Sheikhupura, Nankana and Kasur in Pakistan.

See also

 List of electric supply companies in Pakistan
Pakistan Water & Power Development Authority (WAPDA)
National Electric Power Regulatory Authority (NEPRA)

References

External links 

 LESCO Official Website
WAPDA Official Website
NEPRA Official Website

Distribution companies of Pakistan
Companies based in Lahore
Government-owned companies of Pakistan
Energy in Punjab, Pakistan